North Salawati (Indonesian: Salawati Utara) formerly named Samate, is a district in Raja Ampat Regency, Southwest Papua, Indonesia. North Salawati is located in the northern part of Salawati Island.

History 

In North Salawati, precisely in the Samate village, there was once an Islamic empire founded by Fun Malaban, namely Salawati Kingdom. This kingdom is led by the Arfan clan.

Administrative division 
North Salawati is divided into 8 villages:
 Kaliam
 Kalobo
 Kapatlap
 Sakabu
 Samate
 Solol
 Waijan
 Yefma

References

External links 
 Organisasi.org 

Districts of Southwest Papua